The Diamond Valley Railway is a  ridable miniature railway located at Eltham Lower Park, Eltham, Victoria (a suburb of Melbourne, Australia).  The railway operates a variety of live steam, battery electric and petrol/diesel powered locomotives. It is run by volunteers and operates on every Sunday of the year, most  public holidays and on Wednesdays during school holidays.  The fare is AU$4.00 and one complete mainline journey takes about 12 to 15 minutes.  It is a popular tourist attraction and carries over 150,000 passengers a year.

History
The Diamond Valley Miniature Railway Club was founded in 1960 with equipment relocated from the closed Chelsworth Park Railway (located in Ivanhoe, Melbourne).  The original mainline at Eltham was completed on August 17, 1961, at 0.52 km (0.32 miles) long.  Numerous developments, extensions and improvements took place in the years that followed.  Importantly starting the in mid-1960s the original 1" x 1/2" steel 'rail' was replaced with 14 lb/yard rail recovered from disused quarries, railways and tramways.  (From 2001 the mainline is being progressively relaid with 6 kg/m (12 lb/yd) flat bottomed rail.)

The mainline was significantly expanded in the 1980s to extend down to  the edge of the Eltham Lower Park, (called the outer circle) within sight of Main Road and passing motor traffic. The "Pine Creek Platform" adjacent to the road only operates for special charters.  The full mainline is now 1.92 km (1.21 mi) long and takes about 12 minutes to complete a journey, passing through two tunnels and over a number of bridges.  The line runs over, under and besides itself in a twisted and folded loop.  There are the equivalent of 111 points and crossings in the trackwork.

In the 10 years after it opened the railway carried 250,000 passengers.  By June 12, 2011, after almost 50 years of operation, it had carried 3,000,000 passengers.

In March 1974 the Club was dissolved and all assets were taken over by Diamond Valley Railway Limited with members of the club transferring to the new organisation.

In 2015, Diamond Valley Railway applied to open a second circuit to the south of the current track. The circuit is to be called Yarra Landing Circuit.

Operation
The railway uses operating procedures based Victorian Railways prototypes both semaphore and search light signaling and sometimes staff and ticket.   (All signals are 1/4 of full size).Up to twelve trains can be running at any one time on the mainline.

The "B" signal box near Diamond Valley Station has a miniature lever frame with 80 levers for controlling train movements in the vicinity, and are operated using PLCs. (All buildings 1/2 full size).

The Railway owns fourteen (16) locomotives and over 80 items of rollingstock: 
 four live-steam 
 ten diesel/petrol
 two electric multiple unit (EMU) sets.
Also a number of privately owned locomotives operate on the line (Most rolling stock is 1/6 of full size). Live steam locomotives cannot be used on days of total fire ban.

The Railway has carried over 4 million passengers and usually gets over 2,000 passengers each Sunday

Timetable
Running times are as follows: 
 Almost every Sunday from 11:00am to 5:00pm
 Most public holidays from 1:00pm to 4:00pm 
 During Victorian school holidays (except in December) on Wednesdays from 1:00pm to 4:00pm.

^ the railway does not run on Christmas Day, Labor Day (Victoria), Melbourne Cup Day or substitute public holidays except Australia Day.

Special events timetabling, such as night running (usually in March each year), are also scheduled and private bookings can be made.

Film & Media
In the Australian movie 'I Love You Too (2010)' the lead male character is a full-time train driver at an unnamed miniature railway; the scenes with him at work and the finale were filmed at the Diamond Valley Railway.

There are also numerous videos posted on YouTube featuring the railway.

References

External links 
 Official website: www.dvr.com.au
Walking Maps: Eltham to Diamond Valley Miniature Railway
Wikinorthia: Diamond Valley Miniature Railway

7¼ in gauge railways in Australia
Shire of Nillumbik
1961 establishments in Australia